Anthony John Oliver (born 22 September 1967) is an English retired professional football goalkeeper who played in the Football League with Brentford. He played non-league football for Weymouth and Dorchester Town and later became a goalkeeping coach at the latter club.

Career statistics

References

1967 births
English footballers
English Football League players
Association football goalkeepers
Brentford F.C. players
Living people
Portsmouth F.C. players
Dorchester Town F.C. players
Southern Football League players
National League (English football) players
Weymouth F.C. players